Gabriel Girotto Franco (born 11 July 1992), simply known as Gabriel, is a Brazilian footballer who plays as a defensive midfielder for Internacional.

Club career

Botafogo
 
Born in Campinas, São Paulo, Gabriel joined Paulínia's youth setup in 2006, aged 14, and being known as Gabriel.substitute in a 3–0 home win On 30 January 2011, he made his senior debut, coming on as a second-half against Juventus for the Campeonato Paulista Série A3 championship.

In the 2011 summer Gabriel moved to Botafogo, returning to youth football, but being promoted to the main squad in the following year by manager Oswaldo de Oliveira. He made his first team – and Série A – debut on 20 May 2012, replacing Vitor Júnior in a 4–2 home win against São Paulo.

In the 2013 season, Botafogo won the "Carioca Championship" with 0 losses, with Gabriel being the best championship midfielder.

During the same season, Botafogo qualified for Copa Libertadores after 16 years of absence in the tournament and Gabriel was one of the highlighted players, with names such as Clarence Seedorf and Jefferson among others.

Gabriel renewed his link with Bota on 26 September, signing until 2015. He scored his first professional goal on 27 October, netting the third in a 4–0 home routing over Atlético Goianiense.

On 18 March 2013 Botafogo bought the remaining 30% of Gabriel's rights belonging to Paulínia, with the player being an undisputed starter. In December 2014 Gabriel left Botafogo before signing with Sociedade Esportiva Palmeiras for 2 years.

Palmeiras
 
On 30 December 2014 Gabriel signed a two-year contract with Palmeiras, and subsequently reuniting with his former Botafogo manager Oswaldo de Oliveira. During 2015, he was elected the best Campeonato Paulista defensive midfielder and "Brasileirão" first round best player.

Besides the individual achieved goals, in 2015 Gabriel won the Copa do Brasil with Palmeiras. 

In the middle of the year, when he won a song and the nickname "Pitbull" from the crowd, the athlete seriously injured his left knee in a game valid for the 2015 Brazilian Championship, against Atlético Paranaense and was out for the rest of the season.

In 2016, recovered from the injury, the defensive midfielder returned to the pitch in March. And in May of the same year, Gabriel has a serious injury to his left thigh in a training game against Juventus-SP, where exams pointed to a removal from the lawns that could reach up to 4 months. After that, in 2016, Gabriel was again champion, but this time in Brasileirão championship.

On January 5, 2017, Palmeiras announced via its official website that it would not renew Gabriel's contract with the club.

Corinthians
In the following year, Gabriel signed with Corinthians. The rumored fee was R$7 million for 50% of economic rights.

In his first championship for Corinthians, and being a starter in every match, besides one of the best players, Gabriel was Campeonato Paulista champion. Playing for Corinthians, Gabriel won again the Brasileirão championship, for 2 years in a role (2016 for Palmeiras and 2017 for Corinthians), being the best defensive midfielder according to Mesa Redonda Trophy.

In 2018 and 2019 Gabriel won again Campeonato Paulista, in a sequence of 3 consecutive titles.

Honours
Corinthians
Campeonato Brasileiro Série A: 2017
Campeonato Paulista: 2017, 2018, 2019

Palmeiras
Campeonato Brasileiro Série A: 2016
Copa do Brasil: 2015

Botafogo-RJ
Campeonato Carioca: 2013

Individual
Campeonato Paulista Team of the Year: 2015

References

External links
Palmeiras official profile 

1992 births
Living people
Sportspeople from Campinas
Brazilian footballers
Association football midfielders
Campeonato Brasileiro Série A players
Paulínia Futebol Clube players
Botafogo de Futebol e Regatas players
Sociedade Esportiva Palmeiras players
Sport Club Corinthians Paulista players
Sport Club Internacional players